The David Campbell was a long-serving fireboat built in 1928 for Oregon's Portland Fire & Rescue.  She underwent an extensive rebuild, in 1976.  In 2010 Portland acquired a new smaller, faster fireboat, the Eldon Trinity, after a child died, in 2009, when it took the David Campbell 44 minutes to get to scene to provide medical care.

The David Campbell had two identical sister ships, the Mike Laudenklos and the Karl Gunster.

She remained in operation as late as 2012.

References

External links
 

Fireboats of Oregon